The 2015–16 Cupa României was the seventy-eighth season of the annual Romanian primary football knockout tournament.

Participating clubs
The following 185 teams qualified for the competition:

First round
All matches were played on 15 July 2015.

|colspan="3" style="background-color:#97DEFF"|15 July 2015

|}

Second round
The matches were played on 28 and 29 July 2015.

|colspan="3" style="background-color:#97DEFF"|28 July 2015

|-
|colspan="3" style="background-color:#97DEFF"|29 July 2015

{{OneLegResult|Voința Buftea (4)||0–9|Voința Snagov (3)}}

|}

Third round
All matches were played on 12 August 2015.

|colspan="3" style="background-color:#97DEFF"|12 August 2015

|}

Fourth round
The matches were played on 25 and 26 August 2015.

|-
|colspan="3" style="background-color:#97DEFF"|25 August 2015

|-
|colspan="3" style="background-color:#97DEFF"|26 August 2015

|}

Fifth Round
The matches were played on 8 and 9 September 2015.

|-
|colspan="3" style="background-color:#97DEFF"|8 September 2015

|-
|colspan="3" style="background-color:#97DEFF"|9 September 2015

|}

Round of 32
The matches were played on 22, 23, and 24 September 2015.

|-
| colspan="3" style="background:#97deff;"|22 September 2015

|-
| colspan="3" style="background:#97deff;"|23 September 2015

|-
| colspan="3" style="background:#97deff;"|24 September 2015

|}

Results

Round of 16
All matches were played on October 27, 28 and 29, 2015.

| colspan="3" style="background:#97deff;"|27 October 2015

|-
| colspan="3" style="background:#97deff;"|28 October 2015
	

|-
| colspan="3" style="background:#97deff;"|29 October 2015

|}

Results

Quarter-finals
The matches were played on 15, 16, and 17 December 2015.

| colspan="3" style="background:#97deff;"|15 December 2015

|-
| colspan="3" style="background:#97deff;"|16 December 2015
	
|-
| colspan="3" style="background:#97deff;"|17 December 2015

|}

Results

Semi-finals 
The semi-final matches are played in a round-trip system. The first legs were played on 2 and 3 March 2016 and the return legs were played on 20 and 21 April 2016.

|}

1st leg

2nd leg

Final

References

cup
Romania
Cupa României seasons